Roy Carpenter's Beach is a private beach in the town of South Kingstown in Washington County, Rhode Island. It is located near the village of Matunuck , on Route 1 at the Matunuck Beach Road exit, near Mary Carpenter's, the South Kingstown Town Beach, Moonstone Beach, and the Theatre by the Sea.  The beach has yellow sand and slopes near the water.  The beach has a lot of rocks in the water and on the shoreline, and has suffered from significant erosion in the past several years.  One winter storm heavily damaged the beachfront store Bud's and destroyed the road that paralleled the beach and separated the first row of cottages on the East side from the beach.  The water is often rough and there is a steep dropoff in the first few feet of water.  Often there is a heavy undertow.  There are lifeguards during the summer season and surfboards, boogie boards, and rafts are allowed at either end of the beach.

References

Protected areas of Washington County, Rhode Island
Beaches of Washington County, Rhode Island
Beaches of Rhode Island